Chamak is a 2017 Indian Kannada-language romantic comedy film written and directed by Suni and produced by T. R. Chandrashekar. The film stars Ganesh as Kush, a gynaecologist and Rashmika Mandanna as Kushi, an MBA graduate event organizer. The soundtrack and score is by Judah Sandhy and the cinematography is by Santhosh Rai Pathaje.

Plot 
Dr. Kush is a gynecologist is a man who likes to chill with his friends. He fears marrying someone who would make him compromise his freedom. Gaining advice from one of his friends, he agrees to act innocent and marries a docile, pretty, traditional looking girl Kushi. Later he learns that Kushi is just like him. She gets angry too, she married him for the same reason too: that he looked innocent and she would not have to compromise her freedom. They both apply for a divorce but decide to stay together to not let their family know. They become good friends and later it turns to love. On Kushi's birthday Kush wishes her and gifts her a trip to the sea (maybe Goa) there they try diving boating and confess to each other while being drunk. Before confessing their love they were sanctioned a divorce by the Court. But after that Kushi learned that she was pregnant (maybe because of the sex they had on their first night...or subsequent ones). She decides to keep her baby because she loves Kush but she runs away to not let him know and to protect the baby from her family's disapproval. That's when we see a complete transformation in Kushi's character who moves out alone just to save her child calling it the most precious thing. She returns when she reaches her seventh month. Kush meanwhile takes up a transfer to Italy to escape his broken heart and to take some time off. Later when he comes to see her, due to a misunderstanding deliberately done by her uncle, he leaves more brokenhearted due to the table death of his patient's child due to pregnancy complications and thinking that Kushi won't be with him.

A few weeks pass and Kushi goes into labour at the same hospital Kush enters due to his car accident. While he was being treated, the nurse informs a pregnant patient is in critical condition and there is no surgeon available. Kush agrees to do it without knowing it is Kushi in the OR. He meets his in-laws who explain everything. He helps Kushi deliver their child.
The epilogue is their child grown up (Charitrya's debut) and shows them all living happily.

Cast 
 Ganesh as Kush
 Rashmika Mandanna as Kushi
 Sadhu Kokila
 Raghuram D. P.
 Sumithra
Vanishree (TV scene)
 Sheelam M Swamy
 Hampakumar Angadi
 Charitrya Ganesh
 Pradeep Doddaiah
 Raj Surya as Sunni (friend)

Production 
The project marks the first in the combination of Suni and Ganesh. The project also marks the debut of Ganesh's daughter Charithriya. The filming began on 14 April 2017 in Bengaluru. Further, between 24 and 27 May, a Holi game sequence was shot inviting youngsters to participate in the shoot. The shooting of songs was held at Ireland.

Soundtrack 

Judah Sandy has composed 5 songs.

References

External links 
 

2017 films
2010s Kannada-language films
Indian romantic comedy films
2017 romantic comedy films
Films shot in Ireland
Films directed by Suni